George Reid Andrews is an American historian of Afro-Latin America, and currently a Distinguished Professor at the University of Pittsburgh.

Published Works 
 The Afro-Argentines of Buenos Aires, 1800–1900 (University of Wisconsin Press, 1980)
 Blacks and Whites in São Paulo, Brazil, 1888–1988 (University of Wisconsin Press, 1991)
 The Social Construction of Democracy, work coedited with Herrick Chapman (Macmillan and New York University Press, 1995)
 Afro-Latin America, 1800–2000 (Oxford University Press, 2004)
 Blackness in the White Nation: A History of Afro-Uruguay (University of North Carolina Press, 2010)
 Afro-Latin America: Black Lives, 1600-2000 (Harvard University Press, 2016)

References

Year of birth missing (living people)
Living people
University of Pittsburgh faculty
21st-century American historians
21st-century American male writers
American male non-fiction writers